Paul Meijer (25 October 1967) is a Dutch politician who was the leader and chairman of the regional Forza! Nederland party.

Political career

List Pim Fortuyn 
Meijer began his political in the Pim Fortuyn List. He was elected as a councilor in the municipality of Haarlemmermeer for the LPF and represented the local government sector on LPF's national council.

Forza! Nederland 
Meijer left the party in 2003 due to its deteriorating conditions and founded Forza! Nederland with fellow former LPF politician Fleur Agema, who was elected to the North Holland council. Forza! claims to be based on the core principles of the LPF. Agema subsequently joined the newly formed Party for Freedom in 2006. Meijer remained party chairman and a councilor for Forza! Nederland in Haarlemmermeer. He spoke at the official commemoration for Theo Van Gogh in 2004.

In 2017, Meijer filed a police report over homophobic expressions. In 2018, he filed a police report after the wheels of his car had been loosened. In 2021, Meijer was expelled from the Forza! Nederland Haarlemmermeer faction over disputes with its new chairman Erik Vermeulen.

Partij voor Nederland 
In 2006, Meijer was on the Tweede Kamer elections list of Party for the Netherlands, led by Hilbrand Nawijn. The party, another spinoff of the LPF, was not elected into the national parliament.

Belang van Nederland 
In 2021, Meijer joined the Belang van Nederland party founded by Wybren van Haga.

References

1967 births
Living people
Pim Fortuyn List politicians
Dutch political party founders
Leaders of political parties in the Netherlands
Dutch critics of Islam
Belang van Nederland politicians